Bollybusha Creek is a stream in the U.S. state of Mississippi.

Bollybusha Creek is a name derived from the Choctaw language meaning "slippery elms are there".

References

Rivers of Mississippi
Rivers of Newton County, Mississippi
Rivers of Scott County, Mississippi
Mississippi placenames of Native American origin